Dorking was a parliamentary constituency centred on the towns of Dorking and Horley in Surrey. It returned one Member of Parliament (MP)  to the House of Commons of the Parliament of the United Kingdom  from 1950 – 1983.   In the eight elections during its 33-year lifetime it was held by three Conservatives successively.

History
The seat was created by the Representation of the People Act 1948 and first contested at the 1950 general election. It was abolished prior to the 1983 general election.

Boundaries
The Urban District of Dorking, the Rural District of Dorking and Horley, and in the Rural District of Guildford the parishes of Albury, East Clandon, East Horsley, Effingham, Ockham, Ripley, St Martha, Send, Shere, West Clandon, West Horsley, and Winsley.

In 1983 parliamentary boundaries were realigned to those of the local government districts created in 1974: the town of Dorking became part of Mole Valley district, and just over half of the previous area was transferred to the Mole Valley seat for national elections which took in territory to the north from elsewhere. Horley transferred to the redrawn Reigate seat.

Members of Parliament

Elections

Elections in the 1950s

Elections in the 1960s

Elections in the 1970s

References

Parliament
Parliamentary constituencies in South East England (historic)
Politics of Surrey
Constituencies of the Parliament of the United Kingdom established in 1950
Constituencies of the Parliament of the United Kingdom disestablished in 1983